Crematogaster colei is a species of ant in tribe Crematogastrini. It was described by Buren in 1968.

References

colei
Insects described in 1968